Sir Walter Francis Hely-Hutchinson  (22 August 1849 – 23 September 1913) was an Anglo-Irish diplomat and colonial administrator.

Background and education
Hely-Hutchinson was the second son of Richard Hely-Hutchinson, 4th Earl of Donoughmore. He was educated at Cheam School, Harrow and Trinity College, Cambridge.

Career

Hely-Hutchinson was a barrister of the Inner Temple, 1877; Private Secretary to Sir Hercules Robinson, Governor of New South Wales; for Fiji Affairs, 1874; for New South Wales, 1875; Colonial Secretary of Barbadoes, 1877; Chief Secretary to the Government of Malta, 1883; Lieutenant-Governor of Malta between 1884 and 1889, as Governor and Commander-in-Chief of the Windward Islands between 1889 and 1893 and as Governor and Commander-in-Chief of Natal and Zululand between 1893 and 1901 and Special Commissioner for Amatongaland. While in Natal he inaugurated the system of Responsible Government in Natal, and completed the annexation of the Trans-Pongola Territories, which form an integral part of Zululand.

He was appointed Governor of the Cape Colony in 1901, during the height of the Second Boer War in South Africa, and was the last British governor until the post disappeared when the colony joined the Union of South Africa in 1910. He also acted as High Commissioner for Southern Africa in 1909 during the absence of Lord Selborne. Following the end of the Boer war in June 1902, he was among those responsible for introducing the peace settlement in the colony. In November–December 1902 he made a month long tour of the Malmesbury, Saldanha Bay, Piquetberg, Clanwilliam, and Ceres districts.

He was awarded the honorary degree of Doctor of Law (LL.D.) by the University of Edinburgh and was invested as a Knight Grand Cross of the Order of St. Michael and St. George. He was invested as a Privy Counsellor; thus he was styled The Rt. Hon.

Family
Hey-Hutchinson married in 1881 May Justice, the daughter of General W. C. Justice, C.M.G. (commanding the troops in Ceylon). Their son was the composer Victor Hely-Hutchinson; his daughter, Natalie, married the archaeologist and administrator Gerard Mackworth Young.

References

External links

http://www.thepeerage.com

1849 births
1913 deaths
Alumni of the University of Cambridge
Ambassadors and High Commissioners of the United Kingdom to South Africa
Colonial Secretaries of Barbados
Governors of Natal
Governors of the Cape Colony
Governors of the Windward Islands
Knights Grand Cross of the Order of St Michael and St George
Members of the Privy Council of the United Kingdom
Younger sons of earls
Walter
Presidents of the Southern Africa Association for the Advancement of Science